Gudemnis is a village in the Meghri Municipality of the Syunik Province in Armenia.

Demographics 
The National Statistical Service of the Republic of Armenia (ARMSTAT) reported its population as 39 in 2010, down from 66 at the 2001 census. The inhabitants speak the Kakavaberd dialect of Armenian.

Nature 
The vicinity of the village is designated as the "Gudemnis" Prime Butterfly Area by the Butterfly Conservation Armenia organization, since there are number of species of National and Global Conservation Concern. Those include: Carcharodus lavatherae, Parnassius mnemosyne, Colias aurorina, Chazara briseis, Tomares romanovi, Pseudophilotes vicrama, Phengaris arion, and others.

References 

Populated places in Syunik Province